Kapeleto is a village and a community in the municipal unit Vouprasia, Elis, Greece. It is located in a rural area, 4 km south of the town of Varda, 5 km northeast of Kourtesi and 37 km north of Pyrgos. In 2011 the population was 362 for the village, and 566 for the community, which includes the village Thanasoulaiika. Within the community's limits is the traditional site of the ancient city of Myrtuntium.

Historical population

External links
Kapeleto on GTP Travel Pages (in English and Greek)

References

Populated places in Elis
Vouprasia